Dominic Demeritte (born 22 February 1978 in Nassau, Bahamas) is a retired track and field sprinter who specializes in the 200 metres.

Demeritte was coached some part of her professional career by Henry Rolle.

Career

He became indoor world champion in 2004, his result 20.66 a new Bahamian record at the time.

He attended University of North Carolina at Chapel Hill where he was a two time NCAA All American.

As of 2022 he is a Track and Field coach at Life University.

Personal bests 

 100 metres - 10.26 (2003)
 200 metres - 20.21 (2002)
 400 metres - 47.28 (2002)

Achievements

References

External links
 
 Picture of Dominic Demeritte

1978 births
Living people
Sportspeople from Nassau, Bahamas
Bahamian male sprinters
Olympic athletes of the Bahamas
Athletes (track and field) at the 2000 Summer Olympics
Athletes (track and field) at the 2004 Summer Olympics
Athletes (track and field) at the 2002 Commonwealth Games
Athletes (track and field) at the 2006 Commonwealth Games
Pan American Games competitors for the Bahamas
Commonwealth Games bronze medallists for the Bahamas
Athletes (track and field) at the 1999 Pan American Games
North Carolina Tar Heels men's track and field athletes
Commonwealth Games medallists in athletics
Central American and Caribbean Games silver medalists for the Bahamas
Competitors at the 2006 Central American and Caribbean Games
World Athletics Indoor Championships winners
Central American and Caribbean Games medalists in athletics
Medallists at the 2002 Commonwealth Games